Evolutions Television, commonly known as Evolutions (or more simply Evos), is a television post-production company in London, England. It has three sites across Soho: Great Pulteney Street, Sheraton Street, and a design facility on Wells Street called Earth. Evolutions has been used for programmes including The Apprentice, The F Word, and Top Gear. The company won the 2007 Broadcast Award for Post House of the Year, and in 2010, it was ranked ninth on Televisual magazine's "Facilities 50" list.

Evolutions had a building in Soho Square that it vacated in 2011, around the same time that its senior management team bought out Albion Ventures' stake in the company.

Credits

Made in Chelsea
Seven Days
Ramsay's Best Restaurant
The Apprentice
An Idiot Abroad
The Only Way Is Essex
71 Degrees North
Top Gear
Junior Apprentice
QI
Biggest Loser
Red Dwarf: Back to Earth
Brit Cops: Zero Tolerance
The Victorians
Hospital Heroes
Property Ladder
Shipwrecked: Battle of the Islands
Disaster Eye Witness
The Secret Millionaire

Stewart Lee's Comedy Vehicle
Sound
Cash in the Celebrity Attic
Iran and the West
Weaponology
Picture This
Wife Swap
Police Camera Action!
I Own Britain's Best Home and Garden
Gladiators
Rory and Paddy's Great British Adventure
The One and Only...
Project Catwalk
Best of Friends
Bring Back... Star Wars
Grand Designs Live
Long Way Down
Fur TV

See also
Soho media and post-production community

References

External links
Official website

Mass media companies established in 1994
Television and film post-production companies
Television in the United Kingdom